Winds of Nagual is a 1985 composition for wind ensemble by the North American composer Michael Colgrass. It has become a standard of the wind ensemble/concert band repertoire. Based on the writings of Carlos Castaneda, the work consists of seven movements. Parts are available for rental from Carl Fischer.

Structure
Movement 1: "The Desert: Don Juan Emerges from the Mountains"
Movement 2: "Don Genaro Appears"
Movement 3: "Carlos Stares at the River and Becomes a Bubble"
Movement 4: "The Gait of Power"
Movement 5: "Asking Twilight for Calmness and Power"
Movement 6: "Don Juan Clowns for Carlos"
Movement 7: "Last Conversation and Farewell"

Instrumentation
 Flute I–III (all double piccolo, two double alto flute)
 E sopranino clarinet
 B soprano clarinet I–VI
 B bass clarinet
 E contra-alto clarinet
 B contrabass clarinet
 Contrabassoon
 Soprano saxophone
 Alto saxophone
 Trumpet I–VI (V–VI double cornet)
 Flugelhorn
 Horn in F I–VI
 Trombone I–VI (trombone V–VI should be bass trombones)
 Euphonium (two players)
 Tuba (2 players)
 String bass (2 players)
 Celesta (and piano)
 Harp
 Timpani
 Percussion I–V, including:
 Bass drum
 Bongos
 Cowbell (5)
 Crotales
 Cymbals (1 pair 8" crash, 3 large crash, 4 large suspended)
 Field drum
 Gongs (3)
 Marimba
 Parsifal bell
 Snare drum
 Temple block
 Tenor drum
 Timbales
 Tubular bells
 Vibraphone
 Xylophone

See also
List of concert band literature
List of program music
Program music

References

Battisti, Frank L. The Winds of Change: The Evolution of the Contemporary American Wind Band/Ensemble and Its Conductor. Galesville, Maryland: Meredith Music Publications. pg. 106., 2002. .

Concert band pieces
1985 compositions
Adaptations of works by Carlos Castaneda